

Events

Pre-1600
 393 – Roman emperor Theodosius I proclaims his eight-year-old son Honorius co-emperor. 
 971 – Using crossbows, Song dynasty troops soundly defeat a war elephant corps of the Southern Han at Shao.
1264 – In the conflict between King Henry III of England and his rebellious barons led by Simon de Montfort, King Louis IX of France issues the Mise of Amiens, a one-sided decision in favour of Henry that later leads to the Second Barons' War.
1368 – In a coronation ceremony, Zhu Yuanzhang ascends the throne of China as the Hongwu Emperor, initiating Ming dynasty rule over China that would last for three centuries.
1546 – Having published nothing for eleven years, François Rabelais publishes the Tiers Livre, his sequel to Gargantua and Pantagruel.
1556 – The deadliest earthquake in history, the Shaanxi earthquake, hits Shaanxi province, China. The death toll may have been as high as 830,000.
1570 – James Stewart, 1st Earl of Moray, regent for the infant King James VI of Scotland, is assassinated by firearm, the first recorded instance of such.
1571 – The Royal Exchange opens in London.
1579 – The Union of Utrecht forms a Protestant republic in the Netherlands.

1601–1900
1656 – Blaise Pascal publishes the first of his Lettres provinciales.
1719 – The Principality of Liechtenstein is created within the Holy Roman Empire.
1789 – Georgetown College, the first Catholic university in the United States, is founded in Georgetown, Maryland (now a part of Washington, D.C.) when Bishop John Carroll, Rev. Robert Molyneux, and Rev. John Ashton purchase land for the proposed academy for the education of youth.
1793 – Second Partition of Poland.
1795 – After an extraordinary charge across the frozen Zuiderzee, the French cavalry captured 14 Dutch ships and 850 guns, in a rare occurrence of a battle between ships and cavalry.
1846 – Slavery in Tunisia is abolished.
1849 – Elizabeth Blackwell is awarded her M.D. by the Geneva Medical College of Geneva, New York, becoming the United States' first female doctor.
1870 – In Montana, U.S. cavalrymen kill 173 Native Americans, mostly women and children, in what becomes known as the Marias Massacre.
1879 – Anglo-Zulu War: The Battle of Rorke's Drift ends.
1899 – The Malolos Constitution is inaugurated, establishing the First Philippine Republic. Emilio Aguinaldo is sworn in as its first president.
1900 – Second Boer War: The Battle of Spion Kop between the forces of the South African Republic and the Orange Free State and British forces ends in a British defeat.

1901–present
1904 – Ålesund Fire: The Norwegian coastal town Ålesund is devastated by fire, leaving 10,000 people homeless and one person dead. Kaiser Wilhelm II funds the rebuilding of the town in Jugendstil style.
1909 – , a passenger ship of the White Star Line, becomes the first ship to use the CQD distress signal after colliding with another ship, the SS Florida, off the Massachusetts coastline, an event that kills six people. The Republic sinks the next day.
1912 – The International Opium Convention is signed at The Hague.
1919 – The First Regional Congress of Peasants, Workers and Insurgents is held by the Makhnovshchina at Velykomykhailivka.
1920 – The Netherlands refuses to surrender the exiled Kaiser Wilhelm II of Germany to the Allies.
1937 – The trial of the anti-Soviet Trotskyist center sees seventeen mid-level Communists accused of sympathizing with Leon Trotsky and plotting to overthrow Joseph Stalin's regime.
1941 – Charles Lindbergh testifies before the U.S. Congress and recommends that the United States negotiate a neutrality pact with Adolf Hitler.
1942 – World War II: The Battle of Rabaul commences Japan's invasion of Australia's Territory of New Guinea.
1943 – World War II: Troops of the British Eighth Army capture Tripoli in Libya from the German–Italian Panzer Army.
1945 – World War II: German admiral Karl Dönitz launches Operation Hannibal.
1950 – The Knesset resolves that Jerusalem is the capital of Israel.
1957 – American inventor Walter Frederick Morrison sells the rights to his flying disc to the Wham-O toy company, which later renames it the "Frisbee".
1958 – After a general uprising and rioting in the streets, President Marcos Pérez Jiménez leaves Venezuela.
1961 – The Portuguese luxury cruise ship Santa Maria is hijacked by opponents of the Estado Novo regime with the intention of waging war until dictator António de Oliveira Salazar is overthrown.
1963 – The Guinea-Bissau War of Independence officially begins when PAIGC guerrilla fighters attack the Portuguese Army stationed in Tite.
1964 – The 24th Amendment to the United States Constitution, prohibiting the use of poll taxes in national elections, is ratified.
1967 – Diplomatic relations between the Soviet Union and Ivory Coast are established.
  1967   – Milton Keynes (England) is founded as a new town by Order in Council, with a planning brief to become a city of 250,000 people. Its initial designated area enclosed three existing towns and twenty-one villages. The area to be developed was largely farmland, with evidence of continuous settlement dating back to the Bronze Age.
1968 – USS Pueblo (AGER-2) is attacked and seized by the Korean People's Navy. 
1982 – World Airways Flight 30H overshoots the runway at Logan International Airport in Boston, Massachusetts, and crashes into Boston Harbor. Two people are presumed dead. 
1986 – The Rock and Roll Hall of Fame inducts its first members: Little Richard, Chuck Berry, James Brown, Ray Charles, Sam Cooke, Fats Domino, The Everly Brothers, Buddy Holly, Jerry Lee Lewis and Elvis Presley.
1987 – Mohammed Said Hersi Morgan sends a "letter of death" to Somali President Siad Barre, proposing the genocide of the Isaaq people.
1997 – Madeleine Albright becomes the first woman to serve as United States Secretary of State.
1998 – Netscape announces Mozilla, with the intention to release Communicator code as open source.
2001 – Five people attempt to set themselves on fire in Beijing's Tiananmen Square, an act that many people later claim is staged by the Chinese Communist Party to frame Falun Gong and thus escalate their persecution.
2002 – U.S. journalist Daniel Pearl is kidnapped in Karachi, Pakistan and subsequently murdered.
2003 – A very weak signal from Pioneer 10 is detected for the last time, but no usable data can be extracted.
2018 – A 7.9  earthquake occurs in the Gulf of Alaska. It is tied as the sixth-largest earthquake ever recorded in the United States, but there are no reports of significant damage or fatalities.
  2018   – A double car bombing in Benghazi, Libya, kills at least 33 people and wounds "dozens" of others. The victims include both military personnel and civilians, according to local officials.
  2018   – The China–United States trade war begins when President Donald Trump places tariffs on Chinese solar panels and washing machines.
2022 – Mutinying Burkinabè soldiers led by Paul-Henri Sandaogo Damiba depose and detain President Roch Marc Christian Kaboré amid widespread anti-government protests.

Births

Pre-1600
1350 – Vincent Ferrer, Spanish missionary and saint (d. 1419)
1378 – Louis III, Elector Palatine (d. 1436)
1514 – Hai Rui, Chinese politician (d. 1587)
1585 – Mary Ward, English Catholic Religious Sister (d. 1645)

1601–1900
1622 – Abraham Diepraam, Dutch painter (d. 1670)
1719 – John Landen, English mathematician and theorist (d. 1790)
1737 – John Hancock, American general and politician, first Governor of Massachusetts (d. 1793)
1745 – William Jessop, English engineer, built the Cromford Canal (d. 1814)
1752 – Muzio Clementi, Italian pianist, composer, and conductor (d. 1832)
1780 – Georgios Karaiskakis, Greek general (d. 1827)
1783 – Stendhal, French novelist (d. 1842)
1786 – Auguste de Montferrand, French-Russian architect, designed Saint Isaac's Cathedral and Alexander Column (d. 1858)
1799 – Alois Negrelli, Tyrolean engineer and railroad pioneer active in the Austrian Empire (d. 1858) 
1809 – Surendra Sai, Indian activist (d. 1884)
1813 – Camilla Collett, Norwegian novelist and activist (d. 1895)
1828 – Saigō Takamori, Japanese samurai (d. 1877)
1832 – Édouard Manet, French painter (d. 1883)
1833 – Muthu Coomaraswamy, Sri Lankan lawyer and politician (d. 1879)
1838 – Marianne Cope, German-American nun and saint (d. 1918)
1840 – Ernst Abbe, German physicist and engineer (d. 1905)
1846 – Nikolay Umov, Russian physicist and mathematician (d. 1915)
1855 – John Browning, American weapons designer, founded the Browning Arms Company (d. 1926)
1857 – Andrija Mohorovičić, Croatian meteorologist and seismologist (d. 1936)
1862 – David Hilbert, German mathematician and academic (d. 1943)
  1862   – Frank Shuman, American inventor and engineer (d. 1918)
1872 – Paul Langevin, French physicist and academic (d. 1946)
  1872   – Jože Plečnik, Slovenian architect, designed Plečnik Parliament (d. 1957)
1876 – Otto Diels, German chemist and academic, Nobel Prize laureate (d. 1954)
1878 – Rutland Boughton, English composer (d. 1960)
1880 – Antonio Díaz Soto y Gama, Mexican politician (d. 1967)
1889 – Claribel Kendall, American mathematician (d.1965)
1894 – Jyotirmoyee Devi, Indian author (d. 1988)
1896 – Alf Blair, Australian rugby league player and coach (d. 1944)
  1896   – Alf Hall, English-South African cricketer (d. 1964)
1897 – Subhas Chandra Bose, Indian freedom fighter and politician (d. 1945)
  1897   – Margarete Schütte-Lihotzky, Austrian architect (d. 2000)
  1897   – Ieva Simonaitytė, Lithuanian author (d. 1978)
  1897   – William Stephenson, Canadian captain and spy (d. 1989)
1898 – Georg Kulenkampff, German violinist (d. 1948)
  1898   – Randolph Scott, American actor (d. 1987)
  1898   – Freda Utley, English scholar and author (d. 1978)
1899 – Glen Kidston, English racing driver and pilot (d. 1931)
1900 – William Ifor Jones, Welsh organist and conductor (d. 1988)

1901–present
1901 – Arthur Wirtz, American businessman (d. 1983)
1903 – Jorge Eliécer Gaitán, Colombian lawyer and politician, 16th Minister of National Education of Colombia (d. 1948)
1905 – Erich Borchmeyer, German sprinter (d. 2000)
1907 – Dan Duryea, American actor and singer (d. 1968)
  1907   – Hideki Yukawa, Japanese physicist and academic, Nobel Prize laureate (d. 1981)
1910 – Django Reinhardt, Belgian guitarist and composer (d. 1953)
1912 – Boris Pokrovsky, Russian director and manager (d. 2009)
1913 – Jean-Michel Atlan, Algerian-French painter (d. 1960)
  1913   – Wally Parks, American businessman, founded the National Hot Rod Association (d. 2007)
1915 – Herma Bauma, Austrian javelin thrower and handball player (d. 2003)
  1915   – W. Arthur Lewis, Saint Lucian-Barbadian economist and academic, Nobel Prize laureate (d. 1991)
  1915   – Potter Stewart, American lawyer and judge (d. 1985)
1916 – David Douglas Duncan, American photographer and journalist (d. 2018)
  1916   – Airey Neave, English colonel, lawyer, and politician, Shadow Secretary of State for Northern Ireland (d. 1979)
1918 – Gertrude B. Elion, American biochemist and pharmacologist, Nobel Prize laureate (d. 1999)
  1918   – Florence Rush, American social worker and theorist (d. 2008)
1919 – Frances Bay, Canadian-American actress (d. 2011)
  1919   – Hans Hass, Austrian biologist and diver (d. 2013)
  1919   – Ernie Kovacs, American actor and game show host (d. 1962)
  1919   – Bob Paisley, English footballer and manager (d. 1996)
1920 – Gottfried Böhm, German architect (d. 2021)
  1920   – Henry Eriksson, Swedish runner (d. 2000)
  1920   – Walter Frederick Morrison, American businessman, invented the Frisbee (d. 2010)
1922 – Leon Golub, American painter and academic (d. 2004)
  1922   – Tom Lewis, Australian politician, 33rd Premier of New South Wales (d. 2016)
1923 – Horace Ashenfelter, American runner (d. 2018)
  1923   – Cot Deal, American baseball player and coach (d. 2013)
  1923   – Walter M. Miller, Jr., American soldier and author (d. 1996)
1924 – Frank Lautenberg, American soldier, businessman, and politician (d. 2013)
1925 – Marty Paich, American pianist, composer, producer, and conductor (d. 1995)
1926 – Bal Thackeray, Indian journalist, cartoonist, and politician (d. 2012)
1927 – Lars-Eric Lindblad, Swedish-American businessman and explorer (d. 1994)
  1927   – Fred Williams, Australian painter (d. 1982)
1928 – Chico Carrasquel, Venezuelan baseball player and manager (d. 2005)
  1928   – Jeanne Moreau, French actress (d. 2017)
1929 – Myron Cope, American journalist and sportscaster (d. 2008)
  1929   – Phillip Knightley, Australian journalist, author, and critic (d. 2016)
  1929   – John Polanyi, German-Canadian chemist and academic, Nobel Prize laureate
  1929   – Filaret, Patriarch of the Ukrainian Orthodox Church of the Kyivan 
1930 – Mervyn Rose, Australian tennis player (d. 2017)
  1930   – Derek Walcott, Saint Lucian poet and playwright, Nobel Prize laureate (d. 2017)
  1930   – Teresa Żylis-Gara, Polish operatic soprano (d. 2021)
1932 – George Allen, English footballer (d. 2016)
  1932   – Larri Thomas, American actress and dancer (d. 2013)
1933 – Bill Hayden, Australian politician, 21st Governor General of Australia
  1933   – Chita Rivera, American actress, singer, and dancer
1934 – Pierre Bourgault, Canadian journalist and politician (d. 2003)
1935 – Mike Agostini, Trinidadian sprinter (d. 2016)
  1935   – Tom Reamy, American author (d. 1977)
1936 – Jerry Kramer, American football player and sportscaster
  1936   – Cécile Ousset, French pianist
1938 – Giant Baba, Japanese wrestler and promoter, founded All Japan Pro Wrestling (d. 1999)
  1938   – Georg Baselitz, German painter and sculptor
1939 – Ed Roberts, American disability rights activist (d. 1995)
1940 – Alan Cheuse, American writer and critic (d. 2015)
  1940   – Joe Dowell, American pop singer (d. 2016)
1941 – Jock R. Anderson, Australian economist and academic
  1941   – João Ubaldo Ribeiro, Brazilian journalist, author, and academic (d. 2014)
1942 – Laurie Mayne, Australian cricketer
  1942   – Herman Tjeenk Willink, Dutch judge and politician
  1942   – Phil Clarke, New Zealand rugby union player
1943 – Özhan Canaydın, Turkish basketball player and businessman (d. 2010)
1944 – Rutger Hauer, Dutch actor, director, and producer (d. 2019)
1945 – Mike Harris, Canadian politician, 22nd Premier of Ontario
1946 – Arnoldo Alemán, Nicaraguan lawyer and politician, President of Nicaragua
  1946   – Boris Berezovsky, Russian-English businessman and mathematician (d. 2013)
1947 – Tom Carper, American captain and politician, 71st Governor of Delaware
  1947   – Megawati Sukarnoputri, Indonesian politician, President of Indonesia
1948 – Anita Pointer, American R&B/soul singer-songwriter (d. 2022)
1950 – Richard Dean Anderson, American actor, producer, and composer
  1950   – Guida Maria, Portuguese actress (d. 2018)
  1950   – Suzanne Scotchmer, American economist and academic (d. 2014)
  1950   – Luis Alberto Spinetta, Argentinian singer-songwriter, guitarist, and poet (d. 2012)
1951 – Chesley Sullenberger, American airline pilot and safety expert
1952 – Omar Henry, South African cricketer
1953 – John Luther Adams, American composer
  1953   – Alister McGrath, Irish priest, historian, and theologian
  1953   – Antonio Villaraigosa, American politician, 41st Mayor of Los Angeles
  1953   – Robin Zander, American rock singer-songwriter and guitarist
1954 – Trevor Hohns, Australian cricketer
1957 – Caroline, Princess of Hanover
1958 – Sergey Litvinov, Russian hammer thrower (d. 2018)
1959 – Clive Bull, English radio host
1960 – Jean-François Sauvé, Canadian ice hockey player
  1960   – Greg Ritchie, Australian cricketer
1961 – Neil Henry, Australian rugby league player and coach
  1961   – Yelena Sinchukova, Russian long jumper
1962 – David Arnold, English composer
  1962   – Aivar Lillevere, Estonian footballer and coach
  1962   – Elvira Lindo, Spanish journalist and author
1964 – Jonatha Brooke, American singer-songwriter and guitarist 
  1964   – Mariska Hargitay, American actress and producer
  1964   – Bharrat Jagdeo, Guyanese economist and politician, seventh President of Guyana
  1964   – Mario Roberge, Canadian ice hockey player
1965 – Louie Clemente, American drummer 
1966 – Damien Hardman, Australian surfer
  1966   – Haywoode Workman, American basketball player and referee
1967 – Owen Cunningham, Australian rugby league player
1968 – Taro Hakase, Japanese violinist and composer
  1968   – Petr Korda, Czech-Monacan tennis player
1969 – Andrei Kanchelskis, Ukrainian-Russian footballer and manager
  1969   – Brendan Shanahan, Canadian ice hockey player and actor
  1969   – Susen Tiedtke, German long jumper
1970 – Spyridon Vasdekis, Greek long jumper
1971 – Scott Gibbs, Welsh-South African rugby player and sportscaster
  1971   – Kevin Mawae, American football player and coach
  1971   – Adam Parore, New Zealand cricketer and mountaineer
  1971   – Claire Rankin, Canadian actress
1972 – Ewen Bremner, Scottish actor 
1973 – Tomas Holmström, Swedish ice hockey player
1974 – Glen Chapple, English cricketer
  1974   – Rebekah Elmaloglou, Australian actress 
  1974   – Jack Michaels, American ice hockey commentator 
  1974   – Yosvani Pérez, Cuban baseball player
  1974   – Richard T. Slone, English painter
  1974   – Tiffani Thiessen, American actress
1975 – Nick Harmer, German musician
  1975   – Phil Dawson, American football player
1976 – Brandon Duckworth, American baseball player and scout
  1976   – Anne Margrethe Hausken, Norwegian orienteering competitor
  1976   – Alex Shaffer, American skier
1979 – Larry Hughes, American basketball player
  1979   – Dawn O'Porter, Scottish-English fashion designer and journalist
  1979   – Juan Rincón, Venezuelan baseball player and coach
1981 – Rob Friend, Canadian soccer player
  1981   – Julia Jones, American actress
1982 – Wily Mo Peña, Dominican baseball player
  1982   – Oceana Mahlmann, German singer and songwriter
  1982   – Andrew Rock, American sprinter
1983 – Irving Saladino, Panamanian long jumper
1984 – Robbie Farah, Australian rugby league player
  1984   – Arjen Robben, Dutch footballer
1985 – Dong Fangzhuo, Chinese footballer
  1985   – Doutzen Kroes, Dutch model and actress
  1985   – Yevgeny Lukyanenko, Russian pole vaulter
  1985   – Aselefech Mergia, Ethiopian runner
  1985   – Jeff Samardzija, American baseball player
  1985   – San E, South Korean rapper
1986 – Gelete Burka, Ethiopian runner
  1986   – Marc Laird, Scottish footballer
  1986   – José Enrique, Spanish footballer
  1986   – Steven Taylor, English footballer
  1986   – Sandro Viletta, Swiss skier
1987 – Leo Komarov, Finnish ice hockey player
1988 – Shaun Kenny-Dowall, Australian-New Zealand rugby league player 
1990 – Alex Silva, Canadian wrestler
1991 – Steve Birnbaum, American footballer
1992 – Reina Triendl, Japanese model and actress
1994 – Addison Russell, American baseball player
1995 – Luke Bateman, Australian rugby league player
  1995   – Tuimoala Lolohea, New Zealand rugby league player
1998 – XXXTentacion, American rapper (d. 2018)
2001 – Olga Danilović, Serbian tennis player

Deaths

Pre-1600
 667 – Ildefonsus, bishop of Toledo
 989 – Adalbero, archbishop of Reims
1002 – Otto III, Holy Roman Emperor (b. 980)
1199 – Abu Yusuf Yaqub al-Mansur, Moroccan caliph (b. 1160)
1252 – Isabella, Queen of Armenia
1297 – Florent of Hainaut, Prince of Achaea (b. c. 1255)
1423 – Margaret of Bavaria, Burgundian regent (b. 1363)
1516 – Ferdinand II of Aragon (b. 1452)
1548 – Bernardo Pisano, Italian priest, scholar, and composer (b. 1490)
1549 – Johannes Honter, Romanian-Hungarian cartographer and theologian (b. 1498)
1567 – Jiajing Emperor of China (b. 1507)
1570 – James Stewart, 1st Earl of Moray, Scottish politician (b. 1531)

1601–1900
1620 – John Croke, English politician and judge (b. 1553)
1622 – William Baffin, English explorer and navigator (b. 1584)
1650 – Philip Herbert, 4th Earl of Pembroke (b. 1584)
1744 – Giambattista Vico, Italian historian and philosopher (b. 1668)
1785 – Matthew Stewart, Scottish mathematician and academic (b. 1717)
1789 – Frances Brooke, English author and playwright (b. 1724)
  1789   – John Cleland, English author (b. 1709)
1800 – Edward Rutledge, American captain and politician, 39th Governor of South Carolina (b. 1749)
1803 – Arthur Guinness, Irish brewer, founded Guinness (b. 1725)
1805 – Claude Chappe, French engineer (b. 1763)
1806 – William Pitt the Younger, English politician, Prime Minister of the United Kingdom (b. 1759)
1810 – Johann Wilhelm Ritter, German chemist and physicist (b. 1776)
1812 – Robert Craufurd, Scottish general and politician (b. 1764)
1820 – Prince Edward, Duke of Kent and Strathearn (b. 1767)
1833 – Edward Pellew, 1st Viscount Exmouth, English admiral and politician (b. 1757)
1837 – John Field, Irish pianist and composer (b. 1782)
1866 – Thomas Love Peacock, English author and poet (b. 1785)
1875 – Charles Kingsley, English priest and author (b. 1819)
1883 – Gustave Doré, French engraver and illustrator (b. 1832)
1893 – Lucius Quintus Cincinnatus Lamar II, American lawyer and politician, 16th United States Secretary of the Interior (b. 1825)
  1893   – William Price, Welsh physician, Chartist, and neo-Druid (b. 1800)
  1893   – José Zorrilla, Spanish poet and playwright (b. 1817)

1901–present
1921 – Mykola Leontovych, Ukrainian composer and conductor (b. 1877)
1922 – René Beeh, Alsatian painter and draughtsman (b. 1886)
  1922   – Arthur Nikisch, Hungarian conductor and academic (b. 1855)
1923 – Max Nordau, Austrian physician and author (b. 1849)
1931 – Anna Pavlova, Russian-English ballerina (b. 1881)
1937 – Orso Mario Corbino, Italian physicist and politician (b. 1876)
1939 – Matthias Sindelar, Austrian footballer and manager (b. 1903)
1943 – Alexander Woollcott, American actor, playwright, and critic (b. 1887)
1944 – Edvard Munch, Norwegian painter and illustrator (b. 1863)
1947 – Pierre Bonnard, French painter (b. 1867)
1956 – Alexander Korda, Hungarian-English director and producer (b. 1893)
1963 – Józef Gosławski, Polish sculptor (b. 1908)
1966 – T. M. Sabaratnam, Sri Lankan lawyer and politician (d. 1895)
1971 – Fritz Feigl, Austrian-Brazilian chemist and academic (b. 1871)
1973 – Alexander Onassis, American-Greek businessman (b. 1948)
  1973   – Kid Ory, American trombonist, composer, and bandleader (b. 1886)
1976 – Paul Robeson, American actor, singer, and activist (b. 1898)
1977 – Toots Shor, American businessman, founded Toots Shor's Restaurant (b. 1903)
1978 – Terry Kath, American guitarist and songwriter (b. 1946)
  1978   – Jack Oakie, American actor (b. 1903)
1980 – Giovanni Michelotti, Italian engineer (b. 1921)
1981 – Samuel Barber, American pianist and composer (b. 1910)
1983 – Fred Bakewell, English cricketer and coach (b. 1908)
1984 – Muin Bseiso, Palestinian-Egyptian poet and critic (b. 1926)
1985 – James Beard, American chef and cookbook author for whom the James Beard Foundation Awards are named (b.1905)
1986 – Joseph Beuys, German sculptor and painter (b. 1921)
1988 – Charles Glen King, American biochemist and academic (b. 1896)
1989 – Salvador Dalí, Spanish painter and sculptor (b. 1904)
  1989   – Lars-Erik Torph, Swedish race car driver (b. 1961)
1990 – Allen Collins, American guitarist and songwriter (b. 1952)
1991 – Northrop Frye, Canadian author and critic (b. 1912)
1992 – Freddie Bartholomew, American actor (b. 1924)
1993 – Keith Laumer, American soldier, author, and diplomat (b. 1925)
1994 – Nikolai Ogarkov, Russian field marshal (b. 1917)
  1994   – Brian Redhead, English journalist and author (b. 1929)
1999 – Joe D'Amato, Italian director and cinematographer (b. 1936)
  1999   – Jay Pritzker, American businessman, co-founded the Hyatt Corporation (b. 1922)
2002 – Paul Aars, American race car driver (b. 1934)
  2002   – Pierre Bourdieu, French sociologist, anthropologist, and philosopher (b. 1930)
  2002   – Robert Nozick, American philosopher, author, and academic (b. 1938)
2003 – Nell Carter, American actress and singer (b. 1948)
2004 – Bob Keeshan, American television personality and producer (b. 1927)
  2004   – Helmut Newton, German-Australian photographer (b. 1920)
2005 – Morys Bruce, 4th Baron Aberdare, English lieutenant and politician (b. 1921)
  2005   – Johnny Carson, American talk show host, television personality, and producer (b. 1925)
2007 – Syed Hussein Alatas, Malaysian sociologist and politician (b. 1928)
  2007   – E. Howard Hunt, American CIA officer (b. 1918)
  2007   – Ryszard Kapuściński, Polish journalist and author (b. 1932)
2009 – Robert W. Scott, American farmer and politician, 67th Governor of North Carolina (b. 1929)
2010 – Kermit Tyler, American colonel and pilot (b. 1913)
  2010   – Earl Wild, American pianist and composer (b. 1915)
2011 – Jack LaLanne, American fitness instructor, author, and television host (b. 1914)
2012 – Wesley E. Brown, American lawyer and jurist (b. 1907)
  2012   – Maurice Meisner, American historian, author, and academic (b. 1931)
  2012   – Bingham Ray, American businessman, co-founded October Films (b. 1954)
2013 – Józef Glemp, Polish cardinal (b. 1929)
  2013   – Peter van der Merwe, South African cricketer and referee (b. 1937)
  2013   – Jean-Félix-Albert-Marie Vilnet, French bishop (b. 1922)
2014 – Yuri Izrael, Russian meteorologist and journalist (b. 1930)
  2014   – Riz Ortolani, Italian composer and conductor (b. 1926)
2015 – Ernie Banks, American baseball player and coach (b. 1931)
  2015   – Prosper Ego, Dutch activist, founded the Oud-Strijders Legioen (b. 1927)
  2015   – Abdullah of Saudi Arabia (b. 1924)
2016 – Jimmy Bain, Scottish bassist (b. 1947)
  2016   – Bobby Wanzer, American basketball player and coach (b. 1921)
2017 – Bobby Freeman, American singer, songwriter and record producer (b. 1940)
  2017   – Gorden Kaye, English actor (b. 1941)
2018 – Hugh Masekela, South African trumpeter, composer and singer (b. 1939) 
  2018   – Nicanor Parra, Chilean poet (b. 1914)
  2018   – Wyatt Tee Walker, American civil rights activist and pastor (b. 1928)
2019 – Aloysius Pang, Singaporean actor (b. 1990)
  2019   – Oliver Mtukudzi, Zimbabwean Afro Jazz musician (b. 1952)
2021 – Hal Holbrook, American actor and director (b. 1925)
  2021   – Larry King, American journalist and talk show host (b. 1933)
  2021   – Song Yoo-jung, South Korean actress and model (b. 1994)

Holidays and observances
Bounty Day (Pitcairn Islands)
Christian feast day:
Abakuh
Marianne of Molokai
Emerentiana
Espousals of the Blessed Virgin Mary
Ildefonsus of Toledo
Phillips Brooks (Episcopal Church (USA))
January 23 (Eastern Orthodox liturgics)
Netaji Subhas Chandra Bose's Jayanti (Orissa, Tripura, and West Bengal, India)
World Freedom Day (Taiwan and South Korea)

References

External links

 BBC: On This Day
 
 Historical Events on January 23

Days of the year
January